Ardenode may refer to -
Ardenode, Alberta, in Canada
, a Hong Kong steamship in service 1960-66